Thor Erik Forsberg (born 2 April 1980) is a Norwegian politician for the Labour Party.

He is a member of the Norwegian Parliament from Østfold during the term 2009–2013.

He hails from Sarpsborg.

References

1980 births
Living people
Deputy members of the Storting
Labour Party (Norway) politicians
Østfold politicians
21st-century Norwegian politicians
People from Sarpsborg